= Bqaa Safrin =

Mountain range in Lebanon

- Location within Lebanon

Highest point
- Coordinates: 34°18′10″N 36°3′47″E

Geography
- Location: Lebanon

Bqaa Safrin is a mountain range in Lebanon.
